Someone at the Door may refer to:
 Someone at the Door (play), a 1935 play by Campbell Christie and Dorothy Christie
 Someone at the Door (1936 film), a British drama film
 Someone at the Door (1950 film), a British mystery film